Macna atrirufalis is a species of snout moth in the genus Macna. It was described by George Hampson in 1897. It is found in New Guinea and on Ambon Island.

References

Moths described in 1897
Pyralini